The 2018–19 División de Honor Juvenil de Fútbol season is the 33rd since its establishment.

Competition format
The champion of each group and the best runner-up will play in the 2019 Copa de Campeones and the Copa del Rey.
The other six runners-up and the two best third-placed teams qualify for the Copa del Rey.
In each group, at least four teams (thirteenth placed on down) will be relegated to Liga Nacional.
The champion of the Copa de Campeones will get a place for the 2019–20 UEFA Youth League.

League tables

Group 1

Group 2

Group 3

Group 4

Group 5

Group 6

Group 7

Ranking of second-placed teams
The best runner-up will qualify for the Copa de Campeones.

The seven best runners-up are determined by the following parameters, in this order:
 Highest number of points
 Goal difference
 Highest number of goals scored

Ranking of third-placed teams
The two best third-placed will qualify for the Copa del Rey.

The seven best third-placed are determined by the following parameters, in this order:
 Highest number of points
 Goal difference
 Highest number of goals scored

Copa de Campeones
The seven group champions and the best runner-up were qualified to this competition whose winner will play the 2019–20 UEFA Youth League. The draw was held in Vigo on 23 April 2019.

The quarterfinals were played in A Madroa, while the semifinals and final at Balaídos, in Vigo.

Quarter-finals

Semifinals

Final

See also
2019 Copa del Rey Juvenil

References

External links
Royal Spanish Football Federation

División de Honor Juvenil de Fútbol seasons
Juvenil